Erzsébet Schaár (29 July 1905, in Budafok – 29 August 1975, in Budapest) was a Hungarian sculptor.

Life 
She studied with Zsigmond Kisfaludi Strobl. In 1932, she was awarded the Young Artist Award for the Szinyei Prize. In 1935, she married Tibor Vilt, a sculptor.

Her first solo exhibition was in 1932 in Budapest.
In the 40s, she made small wooden reliefs, similar to the Giacometti statues,
At the same time, she also patterned several reclining figures.
Architectural elements were also employed; since then it has used lightweight styrene, which has created life-size spaces, such as knife-cut, easy-to-saw materials.

In 1970, she had a retrospective exhibition at the Műcsarnok, and two years later she was exhibited in Antwerp and Geneva.
In 1977, the Wilhelm Lehmbruck Museum in Düsseldorf held a retrospective.

There are several public statues exhibited in Budapest, Kecskemét, Miskolc, Pécs, Tihany and elsewhere.
Much of his estate is in St. Stephen's King Museum in Székesfehérvár.

Further reading 
 Németh, Lajos. "Schaár, Erzsébet." In Grove Art Online. Oxford Art Online,  (accessed February 16, 2012; subscription required).

External links 
 
 Entry for Erzsébet Schaár on the Union List of Artist Names

1905 births
1975 deaths
Hungarian women sculptors
Artists from Budapest
Hungarian women artists
20th-century Hungarian sculptors
20th-century Hungarian women artists